The Supreme Election Council (YSK) is the highest electoral authority in Turkey. It was established by the Deputies Election Law no. 5545 on 16 February 1950. After the 1960 coup, the Supreme Election Council gained constitutional authority by the Constitution of 1961. Its duty is to ensure that the principles and rules of the constitution are upheld.

The Supreme Election Council consists of a president, six members and four substitute members from the Court of Cassation and the Council of State judges.

References

External links 
Supreme Election Council English webpages

Elections in Turkey
Turkey
1950 establishments in Turkey
Organizations based in Ankara